The Suzuki Boulevard S83 is a motorcycle manufactured by Suzuki and renamed in 2005.  It features a 1360 cc v-twin engine. It was formerly named the Intruder VS1400 which was introduced in 1987.  Like the Intruder, the S83 retained the model designation VS1400.

Specification

References

Boulevard S83
Cruiser motorcycles